The 2015 Bahrain 2nd GP2 Series round was a GP2 Series motor race held on November 20 and 21, 2015 at Bahrain International Circuit, Bahrain. It was the tenth and penultimate round of the 2015 GP2 Series. The first Bahrain round was held a April. The race supported the 2015 6 Hours of Bahrain.

Classification

Qualifying

Feature Race

Sprint Race

See also 
 2015 6 Hours of Bahrain
 2015 Bahrain GP3 Series round

References

External links
 

GP2
Bahrain